The 2013–14 Toulouse FC season was the club's 44th professional season since its creation in 1970. During the 2013–14 season, the club competed in the Ligue 1, Coupe de la Ligue and the Coupe de France.

Competitions

Ligue 1

League table

Results summary

Results by round

Matches

Coupe de la Ligue

Coupe de France

References

Toulouse FC seasons
Toulouse